is a 2005 Japanese horror anthology film directed by Ryu Kaneda and written by Otsuichi, based on the latter's Zoo series of short stories. The film stars Patrick Harlan, Yui Ichikawa, Ryūnosuke Kamiki, Ryōko Kobayashi and Miyuki Matsuda in the lead roles.

Cast
 Patrick Harlan
 Yui Ichikawa
 Ryūnosuke Kamiki
 Ryōko Kobayashi
 Miyuki Matsuda
 Sakamatsu Mei
 Atsushi Murakami
 Katō Rubi
 Kenta Suga
 Tetta Sugimoto
 Kyōka Suzuki

References

External links
 

2000s Japanese-language films
2005 films
Japanese horror anthology films
2005 horror films
2000s Japanese films